Mame Cheikh Niang (born 31 March 1984) is a Senegalese retired striker.

He won the 2005–06 PSL top goalscorer award (Lesley Manyathela Golden Boot) with 14 goals while playing for Moroka Swallows in South Africa.

Career statistics

References

External links 
 
 

1984 births
Living people
Senegalese footballers
VfL Wolfsburg players
Bundesliga players
Eliteserien players
Norwegian First Division players
Moroka Swallows F.C. players
Viking FK players
Association football forwards
Footballers from Dakar
ASC Jaraaf players
SuperSport United F.C. players
University of Pretoria F.C. players
Cypriot First Division players
AEL Limassol players
Kongsvinger IL Toppfotball players
Senegalese expatriate footballers
Expatriate footballers in Germany
Expatriate soccer players in South Africa
Expatriate footballers in Norway
Expatriate footballers in Cyprus
Senegalese expatriate sportspeople in Germany
Senegalese expatriate sportspeople in South Africa
Senegalese expatriate sportspeople in Norway
Senegalese expatriate sportspeople in Cyprus